Velioglu's chub (Alburnoides velioglui) is a species of freshwater fish in the family Cyprinidae. It is endemic to the Euphrates River drainage in Turkey.

References 

Velioglu's chub
Endemic fauna of Turkey
Freshwater fish of Turkey
Velioglu's chub